The Appenzeller Sennenhund is a Swiss breed of medium-sized working dog. It originates in the Appenzell region of north-eastern Switzerland, and is one of four regional breeds of Sennenhund or Swiss mountain dog, all of which are characterised by a distinctive tricolour coat.

History 

The Appenzeller Sennenhund is the traditional working dog of the  – Alpine cattle-herders and dairymen – of the Appenzell region of north-eastern Switzerland. The earliest written description of it is that of Friedrich von Tschudi in Das Thierleben der Alpenwelt, published in 1853. Eight of the dogs were shown at the international dog show in Winterthur in 1898; they were entered in a new Sennenhunde class.

In 1906 a breed society, the Appenzeller Sennenhunde Club, was established at the instigation of the cynologist Albert Heim, who in 1914 drew up the first full breed standard.

It was definitively accepted by the Fédération Cynologique Internationale in 1954.

It has spread from Appenzell to other parts of Switzerland and to other European countries.

Characteristics 

The Appenzeller Sennenhund is the third-largest of the Sennenhund or Swiss mountain dog group, which also includes the Grosser Schweizer Sennenhund, the Berner Sennenhund or Bernese Mountain Dog, and the Entlebucher Sennenhund.

The coat is double, the top-coat thick, straight and glossy. It it always tricoloured: the principal colour may be either black or Havana brown, with white markings to the chest, face and feet, and reddish-brown areas between those and the base colour.

The tail is set high and is carried in a tight curl over the back when the animal is moving. The ears are set high and are triangular and fairly small; they hang close to the cheeks when the animal is at rest, and are raised and turned forward when it is alert. Among the faults that disqualify a dog from registration are a wall eye, a kinked tail, a single coat and a coat that is not three-coloured. Dogs may be expected to live for some  years.

According to the breed standard, the Appenzeller Sennenhund is lively, high-spirited, athletic and suspicious of strangers.

Use 

The Appenzeller Sennenhund was traditionally used by the Alpine cattle-herders and dairymen of the Appenzell region both to herd cattle and to guard property. It is often kept as a companion dog.

References

FCI breeds
Dog breeds originating in Switzerland
Livestock guardian dogs